Saint Servulus (or Servolo, died ) was a paralyzed beggar who spent all his time praying outside Saint Clement's Church in Rome.
His feast day is 23 December.

Roman Martyrology

The Roman Martyrology of 1916 has an entry under the Twenty-third Day of December,

Monks of Ramsgate account

The monks of St Augustine's Abbey, Ramsgate wrote in their Book of Saints (1921),

Butler's account

The hagiographer Alban Butler (1710–1773) wrote in his Lives of the Fathers, Martyrs, and Other Principal Saints under February 21,

Notes

Sources

 
 
 

Italian Roman Catholic saints
590 deaths